Robert Briggs may refer to:
 Bob Briggs (American football) (1945–1997), played in the American Football League and the National Football League
 Bob Briggs (Australian footballer) (1883–1955), Australian rules footballer
 Bob Briggs (chemist) (1905–1975), New Zealand organic chemist
 Robert Briggs (American football) (born 1941), American football player
 Robert Briggs (character), fictitious Hollywood screenwriter 
 Robert Briggs (MP) (died 1615), MP for Boroughbridge
 Robert Briggs (poet) (1929–2015), American poet
 Robert Briggs (publisher), American author and publisher, for Straight Arrow Press
 Robert Briggs (scientist) (1911–1983), cloning pioneer
 Robert H. Briggs, American lawyer and historian
 Robert M. Briggs (1816–1886), Wisconsin legislator
 Robert O. Briggs (1927–2008), director of the University of California Marching Band
 Robert P. Briggs (1903–1998), American businessman